Utopian Studies is a peer-reviewed academic journal that publishes articles on utopias and utopianism. The journal is published twice a year by the Penn State University Press on behalf of the Society for Utopian Studies. The Editor is Nicole Pohl of Oxford Brookes University, in the United Kingdom.

See also
Moreana

References

External links 
Official website
Utopian Studies on the Penn State Press website
Utopian Studies at Project MUSE

References 

English-language journals
Penn State University Press academic journals
Publications established in 1987
Multidisciplinary humanities journals
Multidisciplinary social science journals
Biannual journals
Utopian studies